The Fred O. Miller House is house located in northeast Portland, Oregon listed on the National Register of Historic Places.

See also
 National Register of Historic Places listings in Northeast Portland, Oregon

References

1914 establishments in Oregon
Houses completed in 1914
Houses on the National Register of Historic Places in Portland, Oregon
Irvington, Portland, Oregon
Neoclassical architecture in Oregon